Penaea is a genus of flowering plants in the family Penaeaceae, found in southern South Africa. They have an unusual type of embryo sac development; after two rounds of mitosis, four nuclei are formed at each pole, leading to a mature embryo sac containing four polar groups each with three cells. When found in other taxa, these embryo sacs are termed Penaea-type.

Species
Currently accepted species include:

Penaea acuta Thunb.
Penaea acutifolia A.Juss.
Penaea candolleana Stephens
Penaea cneorum Meerb.
Penaea dahlgrenii Rourke
Penaea dubia Stephens
Penaea ericifolia (A.Juss.) Gilg
Penaea ericoides (A.Juss.) Endl.
Penaea formosa Thunb.
Penaea fruticulosa L.f.
Penaea fucata L.
Penaea geneiophora Byng & Christenh.
Penaea gigantea (R.Dahlgren) Byng & Christenh.
Penaea lanceolata (R.Dahlgren) Byng & Christenh.
Penaea lateriflora L.f.
Penaea micrantha (R.Dahlgren) Byng & Christenh.
Penaea microphylla (Rourke) Byng & Christenh.
Penaea mucronata L.
Penaea mundii (Sond.) Byng & Christenh.
Penaea petraea (W.F.Barker) Byng & Christenh.
Penaea retzioides (Sond.) Byng & Christenh.
Penaea rupestris (Sond.) Byng & Christenh.
Penaea ruscifolia (R.Dahlgren) Byng & Christenh.
Penaea sarcocolla L.
Penaea speciosa (Sond.) Byng & Christenh.
Penaea sulcata (R.Dahlgren) Byng & Christenh.

References

Penaeaceae
Myrtales genera